Love Songs to the Beatles is a tribute album dedicated to the Beatles, released in 1965 by Mary Wells on the 20th Century Fox label. The album was a personal tribute to the British rock group by Wells, who was one of the first Motown artists to tour overseas as the group's opening act after her single "My Guy" had gained hit status in the UK. Wells befriended all four members of the group and released it as a labor of love. This was her second and last album for 20th Century Fox.

Track listing
All tracks composed by John Lennon and Paul McCartney
"He Loves You"
"All My Lovin'"
"Please Please Me"
"Do You Want to Know a Secret"
"Can't Buy Me Love"
"I Should Have Known Better"
"Help!"
"Eight Days a Week"
"And I Love Him"
"Ticket to Ride"
"Yesterday"
"I Saw Him Standing There"

Personnel
Arranged and conducted by Joe Mazzu
Jack Lonshein – cover design

References

1965 albums
The Beatles tribute albums
Mary Wells albums
20th Century Fox Records albums